Ngai Wah Sing Francis is a Hong Kong entrepreneur and venture philanthropist. He is the Founder and CEO of Social Ventures Hong Kong (SVhk), a venture philanthropic organisation, and co-founded several Hong Kong social enterprises, including Green Monday, RunOurCity and Playtao Foreverland. He currently serves as a Board Member of the Asia Venture Philanthropy Network.

Ngai was recognised as The Purpose Economy's 100 Asia Pioneers in 2014, a Young Global Leader of the World Economic Forum in 2012 and chosen as one of Hong Kong's Ten Outstanding Young Persons in 2011.

Ngai graduated from the City University of Hong Kong and was conferred as an Honorary Fellow by the University in 2013. He is also an avid marathoner.

Career
Ngai began his career in marketing and advertising before joining a listed technology conglomerate in Hong Kong, where he was Assistant Vice-President and Head of Strategy.

He founded venture philanthropic organisation, SVhk, in 2007 to incubate and invest in social enterprises in Hong Kong. In his capacity at SVhk, Ngai co-founded social enterprises Green Monday, RunOurCity and Playtao Foreverland, and serves on the board of the Asia Venture Philanthropy Network, Global Dignity's Hong Kong chapter and co-working space The Good Lab.

Ngai has served as a visiting university lecturer on social entrepreneurship and innovation. He has also delivered talks at events hosted by TEDxYouth@HongKong, the Harvard Club Hong Kong, USAID, Social Enterprise Summit, the Asia Future Enterprise Forum and UK Trade & Investment.

Awards and recognition
Social entrepreneurship and innovation

Completed ultra-marathons

References

Hong Kong chief executives
Year of birth missing (living people)
Living people
Hong Kong marathon runners
Chinese male marathon runners